Émile Poussard (23 November 1909 – 10 December 1992) was a French diver who competed in the 1932 Summer Olympics. He was born in Paris. In 1932 he finished seventh in the 3 metre springboard event.

References

External links
 
 Émile Poussard's profile at Sports Reference.com

1909 births
1992 deaths
French male divers
Olympic divers of France
Divers at the 1932 Summer Olympics
20th-century French people